The 1989 European Athletics Indoor Championships were held at Houtrust in The Hague, Netherlands, on 18 and 19 February 1989.

Medal summary

Men

Women

Medal table

Participating nations

 (7)
 (13)
 (8)
 (4)
 (15)
 (3)
 (9)
 (11)
 (26)
 (30)
 (7)
 (16)
 (1)
 (5)
 (20)
 (18)
 (11)
 (10)
 (7)
 (5)
 (26)
 (24)
 (7)
 (6)
 (2)
 (28)
 (4)

See also
1989 in athletics (track and field)

External links
 Results - men at GBRathletics.com
 Results - women at GBRathletics.com
 The EAA

 
1989
European Indoor Championships in Athletics
European Indoor Championships in Athletics
European Indoor Championships
20th century in The Hague
February 1989 sports events in Europe
Sports competitions in The Hague